Helen Schlachtenhaufen (born March 14, 1995) is an American middle distance runner.

Professional
Helen Schlachtenhaufen signed with Nike in 2021.

Competition record

NCAA
Schlachtenhaufen earned NCAA Division I All-American Second Team honors at 2017 NCAA Division I Outdoor Track and Field Championships. Schlachtenhaufen's senior year at Dartmouth in 2017, she captured the Ivy League title for the indoor mile for the second time and set a new Dartmouth record in the 1,500 meters (4:11.15) before graduating with a degree in psychology.

High school
In the 2013 Illinois High School Association aka IHSA Outdoor Track and Field Championships; Helen Schlachtenhaufen placed 11th in the 1600 meters in 5:07.59.

As a senior in 2012, Helen Schlachtenhaufen placed 61st in IHSA Class AAA State XC Championship in 17:46.0.

As a junior at the 2012 IHSA Outdoor Track and Field Championships; Helen Schlachtenhaufen, Caroline Marwede, Lisa Bennatan, Erin Malles placed 7th in the 4x800 meters in 9:39.50.

Schlachtenhaufen held the Lake Forest High School (Illinois) 800 m school record from 2013 to 2017 with her time of 2:18.33 and 1600 m school record of 5:03.63 from 2013 to 2017 when Emma Milburn reset both records.

Personal Bests

References

External links

 
 Helen Schlachtenhaufen profile Diamond League
 Helen Schlachtenhaufen Lake Forest High School Track and Field Results
 Helen Schlachtenhaufen – Dartmouth Track and Field Results 
 

1995 births
Living people
American female middle-distance runners
People from Chicago
People from Lake Forest, Illinois
Dartmouth Big Green women's track and field athletes
Track and field athletes from Illinois
Sportspeople from Lake Forest, Illinois
21st-century American women